Blackmail is a 1920 American silent drama film directed by Dallas M. Fitzgerald and starring Viola Dana, Alfred Allen, and Wyndham Standing. The film reverses the typical vampire plot of the early silent film period by having the seductive woman, after her marriage, being blackmailed by the rich men she formerly preyed upon.

Cast
 Viola Dana as Flossie Golden 
 Alfred Allen as Harry Golden 
 Wyndham Standing as Richard Harding 
 Edward Cecil as Larry 
 Florence Turner as Lena 
 Jack Roi as James Venable 
 Lydia Knott as Mrs. Venable 
 Fred Kelsey as Police Inspector

References

Bibliography
 Langman, Larry. American Film Cycles: The Silent Era. Greenwood Publishing, 1998.

External links

1920 films
1920 drama films
1920s English-language films
American silent feature films
Silent American drama films
Films directed by Dallas M. Fitzgerald
American black-and-white films
Metro Pictures films
1920s American films